Longitarsus petitpierrei is a species of beetle in the subfamily Galerucinae that is endemic to Spain.

References

P
Beetles described in 1997
Endemic fauna of Spain